Isaiah Kantor (or Issai Kantor, or Isai Lʹvovich Kantor) (1936–2006) was a mathematician who introduced the Kantor–Koecher–Tits construction, and  the Kantor double, a Jordan superalgebra constructed from  a Poisson algebra.

References

Russian mathematicians
2006 deaths
1936 births